De Warande is a Flemish club, located in Brussels, Belgium. The club was founded in Brussels in 1988. 

When founded in 1988, then club received an interest-free loan of €750,000 from Flanders to renovate its building at the Warandepark. In 2018, the Flemish Government granted the business club a 20-year interest-free loan of €800,000 , to "strengthen the Flemish presence in Brussels and promote the international [...] Flanders." Both loans are reimbursed by memberships for 50 or 60 Flemish ministers, heads of cabinet and top civil servants, equivalent to €800 per year, per membership.

See also
 Cercle de Lorraine
 Cercle Gaulois
 Orde van den Prince
 Agoria
 Federation of Belgian Enterprises
 VOKA
 Olivaint Conference of Belgium
 University Foundation

Sources
 De Warande
 Jan Puype, De elite van België - Welkom in de club, Van Halewyck

Reference

Gentlemen's clubs in Belgium
Economy of Belgium
Trade associations based in Belgium
1988 establishments in Belgium
Organizations established in 1988